Partha Ghose  (born 1939) is an Indian physicist, author, philosopher, musician and former professor at the S.N. Bose National Centre for Basic Sciences in Kolkata. He is the former Chairman of Satyajit Ray Film and Television Institute, Kolkata and a member of the Board of Trustees of the Academy of Fine Arts, Kolkata.

Life and works
Partha Ghose is one of India's best known popularizers of modern science. He has written influential papers and books on physics as well as popular books on science. He was an anchorperson in the popular Indian TV shows Quest and Eureka. He has directed  plays and appeared in  media programmes and films including the National Award-winning film 'The Quantum Indians', which is about great Indian scientists Satyendranath Bose, C. V. Raman and Meghnad Saha.
   
Ghose received the National Award for the Best Science and Technology coverage in the Mass Media of the National Council for Science and Technology Communication (NCSTC) for the period 1986–1990. He was also awarded the Indira Gandhi Prize for the popularization of science by the Indian National Science Academy.

He is best known in the physics world for his significant contributions to theoretical physics, particularly the foundations of quantum mechanics.

(i) His paper in collaboration with D. Home and G. S. Agarwal (the GHA experiment) in unraveling the nature of wave–particle duality in single-photon experiments led to its experimental verification by Y. Mizobuchi and Y. Ohtake in Japan and later by M. Genovese and collaborators in Italy. This work has been widely referred to and has found place even in popular texts.,

(ii) His work on Bohmian trajectories of  photons formed the basis for a comparison of these trajectories from those that were later observed experimentally with weak measurements.

(iii) He has also made a pioneering contribution by showing that 'entanglement' can occur in classical polarization optics resulting in violations of Bell-like inequalities hitherto believed to be exclusive to quantum systems. This has led to many investigations and experiments confirming such violations and consequently to a shifting of the boundary between quantum and classical physics.

Ghose's exposition of Rabindranath Tagore’s philosophy and music has found expression in several scholarly papers. He served as the Hon. Secretary of the Visva-Bharati Music Board for a few years.

He also served as a member of the Working Group on National Language Policy, Knowledge Commission, Govt of India.

Awards
 ABP Ananda Sera Bangali Award: 2022

References 

Books edited
  "Solitons and Nonlinear Systems", Proc. of the Seminar-cum-Workshop on Solitons and Nonlinear Systems, Calcutta, eds. D. K. Sinha and P. Ghose, South Asia Publishers, New Delhi, 1986.
  "Particle Phenomenology in the 1990s", Proc. of the Second International Workshop in High Energy Physics Phenomenology (WHEPP II), Calcutta, Jan. 1991, eds.  A. Datta, P. Ghose and A. Raychaudhuri, World Scientific, Singapore, 1992.
  "CP Violation: 25 Years Since its Discovery", Proc. of a Topical Meeting to Celebrate 25 Years of the Discovery of CP Violation, Calcutta, Jan. 1990, eds.  A. Datta, P. Ghose and A. Raychaudhuri, Wiley Eastern.
  "S.  N. Bose : The Man and his Work" (Parts I & II) (eds.  C. K. Majumder, P. Ghose, E. Chatterjee, S. Chatterjee & S. Bandyopadhyay), SNBNCBS, Calcutta, 1994.
 "Particle Physics & Cosmology at the Interface", BCSPIN-IOP-SNBNCBS Winter School Lecture Notes - Vol I, eds. J. C. Pati, P. Ghose & J. Maharana World Scientific, Singapore, 1995.
 "Highlights of Particle Phenomenology", Proc. of the Fourth Workshop in High Energy Physics Phenomenology (WHEPP IV), eds.  A. Datta, P. Ghose and A. Raychaudhuri, Allied Publishers Ltd., 1997.
  "Materialism and Immaterialism in India and the West: Varying Vistas", PHISPC Vol  XII, Part 5, Centre for Studies in Civilizations, New Delhi, 2010 (903 pages).
  "The Poet and the Scientist", a comprehensive account of the correspondence and dialogues between Rabindranath Tagore and Albert Einstein, their background and impact, Visva-Bharati, 2014.
  "Einstein, Tagore and the Nature of Reality", Routledge, London 2017.

1939 births
Living people
20th-century Indian physicists
University of Calcutta alumni
Academic staff of the University of Calcutta
Indian scientific authors
Indian technology writers
Indian social sciences writers
Indian popular science writers
Scientists from Kolkata